Arina Sergeevna Fedorovtseva (born 19 January 2004) is a Russian volleyball player. She current plays for Fenerbahçe and is a member of Russia women's national volleyball team.

Career

Club 

In 2018, Fedorovtseva entered the youth sector of Dinamo-Kazan , where she played for two years, and then she joined the first team, making her Superliga debut in the 2019–20 season, in which she won the Scudetto and the Russian Cup. In the following season, she won the Russian Super Cup and another national cup with the club.

In 2021–22 season, she transferred to the Turkey Super League and signed with Fenerbahçe.

National Team 
Fedorovtseva joined the senior Russian National Team in 2021, and her first debut was on 2021 FIVB Nations League. She also participated in Tokyo 2020 Summer Olympics, which the team finished on 7th place.

References

External links
 Player profile - Fenerbahçe Website
Player Profile -CEV

Living people
2004 births
Russian women's volleyball players
Olympic volleyball players of Russia
Volleyball players at the 2020 Summer Olympics
21st-century Russian women